Cosmopsaltriini is a tribe of cicadas in the family Cicadidae. There are at least 90 described species in Cosmopsaltriini, found in southeast Asia, Australasia, and Oceania.

Genera
These genera belong to the tribe Cosmopsaltriini:
 Aceropyga Duffels, 1977
 Brachylobopyga Duffels, 1982
 Cosmopsaltria Stål, 1866
 Diceropyga Stål, 1870
 Dilobopyga Duffels, 1977
 Inflatopyga Duffels, 1997
 Moana Myers, 1928
 Rhadinopyga Duffels, 1985

References

Further reading

External links

 

 
Cicadinae
Hemiptera tribes